Janet Baus is an American documentary film and television director, producer and editor. In 1993, she co-directed Lesbian Avengers Eat Fire Too with Su Friedrich, about activist group the Lesbian Avengers. In 2003 she produced John Scagliotti's film Dangerous Living: Coming Out in the Developing World about gay and lesbian people in non-Western countries. She had worked with Scagliotti before, having a co-producer credit on his 1999 film After Stonewall. Her 2006 film Cruel and Unusual, co-directed with Dan Hunt and Reid Williams, was a documentary about pre-operative male-female transsexual women in men's prisons. It won the Michael J. Berg Documentary Award at the 2006 Frameline Film Festival and the Freedom Award at L.A. Outfest. Baus has also won the Cine Golden Eagle, the Vito Russo Award, the Chicago International Television Award and the Gold Aurora Award.

Filmography

Director
The Lesbian Avengers Eat Fire Too (1994) with Su Friedrich
Cruel and Unusual (2006)

Producer
Some Ground to Stand On (1998)
After Stonewall (1999)
Dangerous Living: Coming Out in the Developing World (2003)
Cruel and Unusual (2006)
In the Life (2007–2008)

See also
 List of female film and television directors
 List of lesbian filmmakers
 List of LGBT-related films directed by women

References

Further reading
  (book chapter from LGBTQ America Today: An Encyclopedia (2008))

External links
 
 

Living people
American documentary filmmakers
American film directors
American film editors
American women film editors
American film producers
American television editors
American television producers
American lesbian artists
LGBT film directors
LGBT television directors
LGBT film producers
LGBT television producers
American women documentary filmmakers
Women television editors
American women television producers
Year of birth missing (living people)
21st-century American women artists
American women television directors
American television directors